Simple Things may refer to:

Films and television
 Simple Things (film) (Prosty'e veshchi), a 2007 Russian film
 The Simple Things, a 1953 animated Mickey Mouse short

Music
Albums
 Simple Things (Carole King album), 1977
 Simple Things (Zero 7 album), 2001
 Simple Things (Amy Grant album), 2003
 Simple Things (CAS album), 2013 a charity compilation album
 Simple Things (Richie Havens album), 1987

Songs
 "Simple Things" (Amy Grant song), 2003
 "Simple Things" (Jim Brickman song), 2001
 "Simple Things", song by Miguel from the deluxe edition of his 2015 album Wildheart
 "Simple Things", a song by the British trio Dirty Vegas
 "Simple Things", a song written and produced by Armin van Buuren and Justine Suissa
 "Simple Things", Alexander Cardinale feat. Christina Perri song, 2019
 "The Simple Things (Something Emotional)", song by Vanessa Amorosi
 "The Simple Things", a Hey Arnold! song written by Craig Bartlett and Steve Viksten and sung by Randy Travis

Other
 "Simple things should be simple, complex things should be possible" - a famous quote by computer scientist Alan Kay